Michael Emil "Mike" Swoboda (September 29, 1938 – September 6, 2008) was the mayor of Kirkwood, Missouri, first elected to the position in 2000 for a term lasting until 2004, and re-elected in 2004 for a term lasting until 2008.

He was wounded on February 7, 2008, when Charles "Cookie" Thornton went on a shooting rampage at a meeting in the city hall. Swoboda, who was one of the targets of the rampage, was taken to St. John’s Mercy Medical Center in critical condition.
 

Swoboda was shot in the lower jaw, with the bullet exiting from his cheek, and was also shot in the back of his head. He received a surgery on February 7 and a second on February 8, which lasted three hours. On February 13 he opened his eyes, and on the 15th his condition was upgraded to serious. On February 23, his condition was upgraded to satisfactory. However, on September 6, 2008, Swoboda died in hospice after a rapid health decline shortly before his 70th birthday.
 According to Swoboda's son, cancer was an additional factor that contributed to his father's health decline.

See also 
 List of assassinated American politicians

References 

1938 births
2008 deaths
Deaths by firearm in Missouri
Mayors of places in Missouri
People murdered in Missouri
Assassinated American politicians
20th-century American politicians
People from Kirkwood, Missouri